Nalanum Nandhiniyum is a 2014 Tamil romance film written and directed by Venkatesan R., a former associate director of Venkat Prabhu, here making his debut as solo director. Having ventured under Ravindar Chandrasekaran's production house, The Libra Productions, the film features Michael Thangadurai and Nandita Swetha in lead roles.. Running time of the movie is 2 hours 11 minutes.

Plot
Duraipandi and Arunachalam have a worsening foe, but Nala, the son of Duraipandi's sister, and Nandhini, Arunachalam's daughter, have known each other from childhood, love each other, get married, and move to Chennai.Finds work as a teacher. Her falling pregnant and losing her job is a wake-up call; he tries and succeeds in breaking into the film industry and becoming a successful director.

Cast
 Michael Thangadurai as Nalan
 Nandita as Nandhini
 Jayaprakash as Duraipandi
 Azhagam Perumal as Arunachalam
 Renuka as Rajalakshmi
 Soundararaja as Muthu
 Rinson as Brother of Nalan
 Soori as Sivabalan
 Sujatha
 Chaams 
 Jangiri Madhumitha
 Rinson Simon as Nalan's brother
 Venkat Prabhu as Guest Appearance
 SPB Charan as Guest Appearance
 T. Siva as Guest Appearance
 P. L. Thenappan as Guest Appearance

Soundtrack
The audio launch was held on June 1 at the Victoria Hall in Geneva, Switzerland along with the audios of Thillu Mullu and Sutta Kadhai. Behindwoods wrote:"The album houses complex and beautiful melodies, but feels in need of more hooks".

Audio and Trailer Launch in Chennai happened 19 March.

Reception
The reviewer for the Deccan Chronicle judged the film "undercooked", failing to balance the intensity—such as the two warring old men, whose performances he judged the best part of it—with the "charming innocence of the romance". The reviewer for the Times of India found the plot trite and the film "content to coast on feel good moments and melodrama bordering on implausibility".

References

External links
 

Indian romance films
Films shot in Madurai
2010s Tamil-language films
2014 films
2014 romance films